The Myriad was a Seattle-based band. They were selected as 2007's MTV2 Dew Circuit Breakout champions. Their newest album, With Arrows, With Poise, was released on May 13, 2008.

After touring for four years, the band went on hiatus in late 2008 after finding out their drummer Randy Miller had been diagnosed with cancer.  In August 2009 the band announced they were heading out on the "All Creatures Tour". 
 
Drummer Randy Miller died from chondrosarcoma on November 5, 2010. The family set up a place for people to donate money to his family who lacked insurance.

Past members

Jeremy Edwardson – guitar
Steven Tracy – guitar, piano, keyboards
Randy Miller - drums (Deceased) November 5, 2010
Scott Davis – drums
John Roger Schofield – bass guitar
Jonathan Young – guitar

Discography
Studio albums
2005: You Can't Trust a Ladder (Floodgate Records)
2008: With Arrows, With Poise  (Koch Records)

EPs
2002:Until We Meet Again EP
2003:Which of You EP
2004:The Myriad EP
2007:Prelude to Arrows EP (Koch Records)

Singles
 Their song "A Thousand Winters Melting" hit the Top 15 on the U.S. Contemporary Christian Music chart in April 2008.
 "A Clean Shot" - Most played video on MTV, May 2008, and also released on Rock Band, June 2008.

References

External links
Official YouTube page
Official PureVolume Page

Musical groups established in 2004
Alternative rock groups from Washington (state)
Emo musical groups from Washington (state)
Christian rock groups from Washington (state)